Eil Malk or Mecherchar is the main island of the Mecherchar Islands, an island group of Palau in the Pacific Ocean. In a more narrow sense, just the southeastern peninsula of Mecherchar is called Eil Malk.

Geography
Eil Malk is located 23 kilometers southwest of Koror near the fringing reef of Palau. The neighbor island is Ngeruktabel.

This densely wooded island has the shape of a letter Y, is up to 6 km long and 4.5 km wide. There are more than 10 small lakes on the island. Most well known is the Jellyfish Lake in the east of the island.

Eil Malk is uninhabited, but there has been at least one village, perhaps three villages in the period between 1200 and 1450.

See also

 Desert island
 List of islands

References

External links
 Map of the Mecherchar Islands

Uninhabited islands of Palau
Koror